Cynoglossus arel, commonly known as the largescale tonguesole, is a species of tonguefish. The eyed side of the fish is uniform brown, with a dark patch on the gill cover, and its blind side is white. They are harmless to humans and predominantly feed on bottom-living invertebrates.

Distribution 
It is commonly found in muddy and sandy bottoms of the Indo-West Pacific and Indian Ocean, from the Persian Gulf to Sri Lanka and Indonesia, and as far north as the south coast of Japan, down to depths of 125 metres.

Description 
They have no dorsal spines, 116-130 dorsal soft rays, no anal spines, 85-98 anal soft rays, and 50-57 vertebrae. The average size of this species is 30 cm (12 in) and the max length is 40 cm (16 in).

References

Cynoglossidae
Fish described in 1801